Al Maghribia channel is a part of the state-owned SNRT Group along with Al Aoula, Arryadia, Athaqafia, Assadissa, Aflam TV, Tamazight TV and Laayoune TV. The channel was launched on 18 November 2004 by Morocco's Broadcasting and Television National Company.

Its programming consists of reruns of TV shows from Morocco TV network 2M and SNRT-owned TV channels, with newscasts being broadcast in French, Spanish, Arabic and Berber.
Al Maghribiya was created around the concept of the French TV channel TV5Monde and is focused towards the Moroccan diaspora living in other countries.

In January 2014, Abdessamad Bencherif announced its intention to make Al Maghribiya an international news channel with the purpose of "countering misinformation from Morocco's rivals and enemies of its interests."

The channel started broadcasting in high-definition on 20 November 2017.

References

External links

Television stations in Morocco
Television channels and stations established in 2004
Société Nationale de Radiodiffusion et de Télévision